Cyttomimus is a genus of zeniontid fishes native to the Pacific Ocean.

Species
There are currently two recognized species in this genus:
 Cyttomimus affinis M. C. W. Weber, 1913 (false dory)
 Cyttomimus stelgis C. H. Gilbert, 1905

References

Zeniontidae
Ray-finned fish genera